This is a list of all lighthouses in the U.S. state of New York as identified by the United States Coast Guard.

References 

New York

New York (state) transportation-related lists
Lighthouses